Soy Suspenso was a Mexican rock band from Aguascalientes, Mexico formed in 2012. They released three studio albums, several singles and one demo available through music streaming platforms.

History

The band was formed in 2012 by Omar Montañez (a.k.a. Ace Midas) on vocals, and Alex Medina on Bass. They later recruited Pol Gómez (drums) and Julio César Álvarez (lead guitar). Their debut album Hotel Venganza was released in 2012 touring México and sharing stage with bands and acts such as: El Tri, Molotov, Café Tacuba, Steve Aoki, Eyes Set to Kill, Greeley States, Allison, Finde, Delux, Thermo, Insite, Aurum, Here Comes the Kraken, Resorte, Joliette and many others. Their 2nd full-length album was Brigada Ignis. A few months later Álvarez left the band and Alejandro Santillan entered as their new permanent lead guitar player.

The band was featured on Alternative Press, Exa TV, Telehit, HTV, VH1, The Vacant Music, Blank TV and Punkeando!'s 20 best albums of 2014.

For the first time the video channel VH1 has scheduled its latest video entitled "Lo Que Queda de ti"  leading to more countries of the world

is a registered downloads of their music in more than 10 countries around the world such is the case as Germany, India, Spain, Colombia, United States, Australia, New Zealand, Canada, Hungary, Peru.

The band released their 3rd full-length studio album named "Tiene Que Ser Ahora" worldwide on YouTube, Spotify and many other digital stores on February 28, 2017, also adding Jeronimo Sarmiento to the permanent band line-up.

In June 2018 the band announced their permanent breakup via Facebook due to creative differences, leaving Omar focused on his solo career as Ace Midas, Jero on his main band Enjoy the Last Sunrise, Pol on his new metalcore band Nativo and the remaining members on other personal projects.

On June 13, 2018 Omar released his debut solo rap album as Ace Midas called "Alma Mater" on all music platforms.

In August 2019 Omar announced a new EP named "La Ilusión de Control" via his new band Espera A Los Lobos along with his ex band mates Jero & Julio.

Style

The band's musical style is a fusion of Metal, post-hardcore and pop, adding elements of nu-metal, rap, electronic music and alternative rock music.

Members

Current members

Omar Montañez – Vocals (2012–2018)

Pol Gómez – Drums (2012–2018)

Alejandro Santillan – Lead Guitar (2014–2018)

Jerónimo Sarmiento - Rhythm Guitar (2017–2018)

Uriel Hernández - Bass (2018)

Former members
Julio César Álvarez – Lead Guitar (2012–2014)

Alejandro Medina - Bass (2012–2017)

Discography
2012 – Hotel Venganza

2014 – Brigada Ignis

2017 - Tiene Que Ser Ahora

Singles
2016 – Desde Las Sombras

Demos
2012 – Demos & B-Sides

References

Sources 

 

Musical groups established in 2012
Mexican rock music groups
2012 establishments in Mexico